Rag-i-Bibi (Veins of the Lady) refers to a Sassanian rock relief on a cliff in modern Afghanistan. It first became known to western scholarship in 2002. It is located about a kilometre south of Shamarq and 10 km south of Puli Khumri. Rag-i-Bibi is the local name of the relief, which refers to Fatimah the daughter of Muhammad, who is venerated by the Shiites.

The relief is 4.9 m high and 6.5 m wide. It has been largely destroyed, partially by weathering and partially by Taliban iconoclasm. At the end of Taliban rule, local villagers reported the relief to local authorities, since they feared it would be damaged. Thus, individual Taliban were conscious of the relief and damaged it on the grounds that local residents "worshipped" it.

The relief shows a Sassanian king hunting an Indian rhinoceros. The king reins in a galloping horse. His figure would be about 2.4 m high if it were standing upright. Three figures stand around the king. Behind the ruler's horse, another two can be made out, which are poorly preserved. The upper portion of the relief shows a band of poorly preserved architectural features.

The king's head is particularly severely damaged. The crown might enable an identification with a historical king; some stylistic details suggest that Shapur I is depicted. Stylistically, the relief contains Sassanian features, but also local Gandhara ones.

Bibliography 
 Frantz Grenet, Jonathan Lee, Philippe Martinez, François Ory: The Sasanian relief at Rag-i Bibi (Northern Afghanistan). In: Joe Cribb, Georgina Herrmann (Ed.): After Alexander. Central Asia before Islam (= Proceedings of the British Academy 133). Oxford University Press, Oxford 2007, p. 243–267.

External links 
 Jona Lendering Sasanian rock reliefs Livius.org (accessed 04/08/2007).
 
 Georgina Hermann & Vesta S. Curtis Sasanian rock reliefs Encyclopædia Iranica (accessed 19/07/2008)
 Rag-i bibi : un relief sassanide en Afghanistan

Archaeological sites in Afghanistan
Sasanian art
Baghlan Province
Horses in art
Hunting in art
Rock reliefs